Grindstone Run is a small tributary of Slippery Rock Creek in western Pennsylvania.  The stream rises in eastern Lawrence County flows northwest into Slippery Rock Creek in McConnells Mill State Park.

See also 
 List of rivers of Pennsylvania

References

Rivers of Pennsylvania
Tributaries of the Beaver River
Rivers of Lawrence County, Pennsylvania